Gamhariya Parwaha is ward in Dakneshwori Municipality in Saptari District in the Sagarmatha Zone of south-eastern Nepal. At the time of the 2011 Nepal census it had a population of 6,145 people living in 1,070 individual households.

References

Sources
https://web.archive.org/web/20181005234846/http://cbs.gov.np/image/data/Population/VDC-Municipality.  Government of Nepal. National Planning Commission. November 2012.
https://election.ekantipur.com/pradesh-2/district-saptari?lng=eng. Kantipur Newspaper
https://thehimalayantimes.com/tag/saptari-election-results/.
https://web.archive.org/web/20180831065451/http://103.69.124.141/

Populated places in Saptari District
VDCs in Saptari District